Oier Zarraga Egaña (born 4 January 1999) is a Spanish professional footballer who plays for Athletic Bilbao as a central midfielder.

Career
Born in Getxo, Biscay, Basque Country, Zarraga joined Athletic Bilbao's youth setup in 2009, from hometown side Romo FC. He made his senior debut with the farm team during the 2017–18 season, in Tercera División.

Zarraga made his debut with the reserves on 3 February 2019, coming on as a second-half substitute for Gaizka Larrazabal in a 2–1 Segunda División B home win against SD Leioa. Definitely promoted to the B-side in June 2019, he subsequently became a regular starter for the team, playing in all matches of the 2019–20 campaign before the season was curtailed due to the COVID-19 pandemic.

In July 2020, Zarraga was called up to the pre-season with the main squad. He made his professional – and La Liga – debut on 18 October, replacing Unai López in a 2–0 home win against Levante UD. In February 2021 he signed a new contract running to summer 2023, also confirming his status as a first team squad member.

Career statistics

References

External links
 
 
 
 
 

1999 births
Living people
Footballers from Getxo
Spanish footballers
Association football midfielders
La Liga players
Segunda División B players
Tercera División players
CD Basconia footballers
Bilbao Athletic footballers
Athletic Bilbao footballers